John Robert Gibson (December 20, 1925 – April 19, 2014) was a United States circuit judge of the United States Court of Appeals for the Eighth Circuit and a United States district judge of the United States District Court for the Western District of Missouri.

Early life and education 

Born in Springfield, Missouri, Gibson was a sergeant in the United States Army from 1944 to 1946. He received an Artium Baccalaureus degree in 1949 from the University of Missouri, followed by a Juris Doctor from the University of Missouri School of Law in 1952. He was in private practice of law in Kansas City, Missouri from 1952 to 1981.

Federal judicial service 

Gibson was nominated by President Ronald Reagan on July 9, 1981, to a seat on the United States District Court for the Western District of Missouri vacated by Judge Elmo Bolton Hunter. Confirmed by the United States Senate on September 16, 1981, Gibson received his commission three days later. His service was terminated on March 30, 1982, due to elevation to the Eighth Circuit.

On February 2, 1982, Gibson was nominated by Reagan to a seat on the United States Court of Appeals for the Eighth Circuit that had been vacated by Judge Floyd Robert Gibson, who had assumed senior status. President Jimmy Carter previously had nominated Howard F. Sachs to the seat, but Sachs' nomination was not acted upon by the United States Senate before Carter's presidency ended, and Reagan chose not to renominate Sachs. Reagan initially had brought forth the name of Hallmark Cards associate general counsel Judith Whittaker (born June 12, 1938) as a nominee to replace Floyd Gibson. However, after it emerged that Whittaker had supported the Equal Rights Amendment, conservatives opposing her nomination launched a letter-writing campaign objecting to her nomination, and Whittaker eventually withdrew her name from consideration. On March 4, 1982, the Senate confirmed Gibson and he received his commission on March 9, 1982. Gibson assumed senior status on January 1, 1994 and died on April 19, 2014.

See also 
 Jimmy Carter judicial appointment controversies

References

Sources
 

1925 births
2014 deaths
People from Springfield, Missouri
Military personnel from Missouri
Judges of the United States Court of Appeals for the Eighth Circuit
Judges of the United States District Court for the Western District of Missouri
Missouri lawyers
United States court of appeals judges appointed by Ronald Reagan
United States district court judges appointed by Ronald Reagan
20th-century American judges
University of Missouri alumni
United States Army personnel of World War II